The 2011 Wyre Forest District Council election took place on 5 May 2011 to elect members of Wyre Forest District Council in Worcestershire, England. One third of the council was up for election and the Conservative Party stayed in overall control of the council.

After the election, the composition of the council was:
Conservative 24
Labour 6
Liberal 5
Health Concern 4
Independent 3

Background
After the last election in 2010 the Conservatives had a majority on the council with 23 seats, compared to 8 for Health Concern, 5 Liberals, 3 Labour, 2 Liberal Democrats and 1 independent. However, in late May 2010 the leader of Health Concern on the council, Howard Martin, left the party to sit as an independent and went on to join Labour in September 2010. Another change came in March 2011 when both of the Liberal Democrat councillors, husband and wife Peter and Helen Dyke, left the party to become independents due to disillusionment with the national Conservative-Liberal Democrat coalition.

Election result
The Conservatives retained a majority on the council with 24 councillors and gained a seat from Health Concern in Mitton. Labour were the other party to make gains, taking an extra 2 seats, including gaining Areley Kings from Health Concern by 39 votes. This made Labour the second largest party on the council with six seats, while Health Concern dropped three to have four seats. Meanwhile, Peter Dyke held Aggborough and Spennells as an independent, after having left the Liberal Democrats earlier in the year.

Ward results

References

2011
2011 English local elections
2010s in Worcestershire